Gimbel may refer to:

People
Adam Gimbel (1817–1896), American businessman and founder of the Gimbels department store
Bernard Gimbel (1885–1966), American businessman who served as president of the Gimbels department store
Bruce Alva Gimbel (1913–1980), American businessman who served as president of the Gimbels department store
Elinor S. Gimbel (1896–1983), American progressive leader and women's rights activist
Howard Gimbel (born 1934), Canadian ophthalmologist 
Norman Gimbel (1927–2018), American lyricist
Peter Gimbel (1927–1987), American filmmaker and underwater photojournalist
Richard Gimbel (1898–1970), American businessman, war veteran, and curator
Roger Gimbel (1925–2011), American television producer
Sophie Gimbel (1898–1981), American fashion designer
Thom Gimbel (born 1959), American musician
Mohsen Gimbel (born 1990), Iran Gentleman

Other
Gimbels, American department store

See also
Gimbal, a pivoted support that allows the rotation of an object about a single axis
Johnny Gimble (1926–2015), American country musician and fiddler

Surnames